Howard Reid Cable (December 15, 1920March 30, 2016) was a conductor, arranger, music director, composer, and radio and television producer. He was born in Toronto, Ontario, Canada.

Biography
Cable received an Associate diploma (ATCM) from The Royal Conservatory of Music in Toronto in conducting and bandmastership 1939.  He is also a recipient of an honorary Doctor of Fine Arts (DFA) degree from the University of Lethbridge in 2002. Cable studied piano, clarinet, and oboe, and played in the Parkdale Collegiate Institute orchestra under Leslie Bell. While leading a dance band, the Cavaliers, 1935-41 in Toronto and at southern Ontario summer resorts, he studied at the Toronto Conservatory of Music with Sir Ernest MacMillan, Ettore Mazzoleni, and Healey Willan. He also studied with John Weinzweig in 1945.

Cable composed and arranged the original theme for the Hockey Night in Canada television broadcast, Saturday's Game, which opened the broadcast from 1952 until 1968. His arrangement for solo piano of Dolores Claman's The Hockey Theme that was the show's theme from 1968 until the mid-2000s is one of the best selling pieces of sheet music in Canada. (Jerry Toth arranged the broadcast version of "The Hockey Theme".)

Cable was conductor for the early CBC TV variety programs General Electric Showtime and Mr. Show Business. In addition he conducted and arranged music for various CBC radio and TV programs in the 1960s. From 1971 to 1985 he was host of the program Howard Cable Presents heard on St. Catharines radio station "CHRE-fm", and for most of the years it was the station's highest rated program.

It was Howard Cable's longtime relationship with Canadian Brass that put him on the international stage through numerous recordings and radio appearances.

In 1999, he was made a Member of the Order of Canada in recognition of his "legendary contribution to the Canadian music industry".

Musical Works

Brass Quintet
Agnus Dei
Carnival of Venice
Civil War Medley
Concerto Op 4 No 6
Contrapunctus No. 9
Coranto Alarm
Cum rides mihi
D'ou viens-tu, bergere
Data est de lachryis mihi voluptas
First Nowell
Flight of the Tuba [Bumble] Bee
Greensleeves
Holly and the Ivy
Ida and Dottie
Jig
Jingle Bells
Joker, The
Joy to World
It Came Upon a Midnight Clear
La Cloche de Noel
La Rose Nuptiale
La Virgen de la Macarena
Lassus Trombone
Lo How a Rose e'er Blooming
Maple Leaf Rag
McIntyre Ranch Country
Newfoundland Rhapsody
Newfoundland Sketch
Noël Nouvelet
O Christmas Tree
O Come All Ye Faithful
O Little Town of Bethlehem
Midnight Clear
Perpetual Motion
Point Pelee (Horn solo with, 2nd mvt to "Ontario Pictures")
Queen of Night
Rowland  (Lord Willowbye's Welcome Home)
Saddles and Saloons
Satyr's Dance
Silent Night
Six Carols A-Singing
Sousa Collection
Spinning Song
St. David's Day
Stephen Foster Treasury, A
The Challenge
Twelve Days of Christmas
Two Little Bullfinches
War Between the States
Wm Boyce  Suite

Brass Ensemble
Atlantic Medley
Canzon in echo duodecimi toni
Canzon No. 28
Canzon per sonar septimi et octavi toni a 12
Credo
Domine labia mea aperies
E questra vita
Gloria: Et in terra pax
Hodie completi sunt
Jubilate Deo
Kyrie eleison
Un  Canadien Errant
Olympic Fanfare
Peter Amberly
Sanctus
Sanctus VI: Hosanna in excelsis
Sonata octavi toni

Brass & Choir
Ding Dong Merrily On High
O Christmas Tree
Six Carols A-Singing
Twelve Days of Christmas
 Up on a Rooftop

Choir
 Anne of Green Gables (SSA)
 Up on a Rooftop (SATB)

Wind Ensemble/Concert Band
 Newfoundland Rhapsody (1956)
 Quebec Folk Fantasy (1953)
 Snake Fence Country (1954)
 Ontario Pictures (1986)
 McIntyre Ranch Country (2002)
 Good Medicine (2005)
 Saskatchewan Overture (2007)
 Canadian Musical Heroes (2015)
 A Musical Tribute to a Legendary Music Man (2016)
Concertino for Bass Trombone (2016)

Marching Band
 10 Provinces March (an arrangement of folk tunes)

References

 Cable, Howard  entry in The Encyclopedia of Music in Canada (part of The Canadian Encyclopedia)
 Howard Cable  Northdale Music Press Ltd. biography
 Howard Cable Canadian Music Centre biography

External links
 Howard Cable profile for University of Lethbridge Music Department
 Howard Cable Remembers the personal blog of Howard Cable

1920 births
2016 deaths
20th-century classical composers
20th-century Canadian composers
Canadian classical composers
Canadian male classical composers
Members of the Order of Canada
Musicians from Toronto
The Royal Conservatory of Music alumni
20th-century Canadian male musicians